The Bush Club is an Australian bushwalking club founded in 1939 in Sydney, New South Wales, Australia.

Foundation and early history 
The club was founded by Marie Byles and Paddy Pallin, in 1939 after they saw the need for a new club that allowed people to be introduced to bushwalking and the Australian bush, without overnight camping or entry tests.

Geographical area of activity 
The club organizes walks in national park areas around Sydney including the Royal National Park, the Blue Mountains National Park, and others of the Hawkesbury River region.

Membership 
Membership is open to anyone over 18 after they complete at least three qualifying walks.

Leadership and management 
The club and its activities are run by volunteers.

See also 

 Sydney Bush Walkers Club
 Caloola Club

References

Sources

External links 
 Bush Club website

Hiking organisations in Australia